The Tokyo Foundation for Policy Research (Japanese 東京財団政策研究所 Tōkyō Zaidan Seisaku Kenkyūsho) is a Japanese public policy think tank. It is a private-sector, not-for-profit institute conducting independent research and rigorous analysis of policy challenges confronting Japan and other industrial nations.  It is also engaged in leadership development, administering several fellowship programs to nurture the next generation of leaders in countries around the world.

Overview 
Founded: July 1, 1997
President: Izumi Kadono (since June 2018)
Chief scientific adviser: Kiminori Matsuyama (since December 2018)
Address: Roppongi Grand Tower 34F, 3-2-1 Roppongi, Minato-ku, Tokyo, Japan, 106-6234
Endowment: Approx. 37 billion yen (as of March 31, 2019)

History 
The Tokyo Foundation for Policy Research was founded on July 1, 1997, as the “Global Foundation for Research and Scholarship” with donations from the Japanese Shipbuilding Industry Foundation (now the Nippon Foundation) and Japan’s boat-racing industry following authorization by the Minister of Transport (now the Minister of Land, Infrastructure, and Transport, and Tourism).

Nippon Foundation Chairman Yōhei Sasakawa serves as adviser to the president. Additional sources of its endowment at the time of its founding included 3 billion yen from the Ship and Ocean Foundation (now part of the Sasakawa Peace Foundation) and 8 billion yen from the Sasakawa Peace Foundation.

It was renamed the “Tokyo Foundation” in May 1999; became a public interest incorporated foundation on April 1, 2010, upon authorization by the Cabinet Office; and adopted its current name, “The Tokyo Foundation for Policy Research,” in February 2018 as part of its reorganization into a more research-intensive institute for evidenced-based, theoretically informed policy studies.

Notable scholars like Gerald Curtis and Katsuhito Iwai, senior fellows when the organization was known as the Tokyo Foundation, are still associated with the think tank as distinguished fellows.

Activities 
Its activities during the years as the Toyo Foundation centered on three domains, as expressed in its tagline: (1) Developing People, (2) Investing in People, and (3) Transforming Society. Since its restructuring following its twentieth anniversary, the Tokyo Foundation for Policy Research has aimed to become a public policy think tank that (1) conducts rigorous, high-quality research, (2) pursues its activities from an independent and not-for-profit viewpoint, and (3) changes society for the better by offering a broad range of policy options. Its leadership development initiatives are focused on developing “socially engaged leaders with outstanding academic credentials who are capable of transcending differences in an increasingly divisive world.”

Current and past presidents 

 Kimindo Kusaka
 Heizō Takenaka
 Hideki Katō
 Masahiro Akiyama
 Takeo Hoshi
 Izumi Kadono (since June 2018)

Notable scholars and board members 
Parentheses indicate position during their affiliation with the Tokyo Foundation for Policy Research. Other titles cited are major, non-Foundation affiliations.

 Reiko Akiike (Trustee), Managing Director & Senior Partner, Boston Consulting Group
 Motoshige Itoh (Trustee), Professor, Gakushūin University; Professor Emeritus, University of Tokyo 
 Katsuhito Iwai (Distinguished Fellow), Visiting Professor, International Christian University; Professor Emeritus, University of Tokyo
 Ke Long (Senior Fellow)
 Gerald Curtis (Distinguished Fellow), Burgess Professor of Political Science, Columbia University
 Yoriko Kawaguchi (Distinguished Fellow), Minister for Foreign Affairs, Japan 
 Ryō Kambayashi (Senior Fellow), Professor, Institute of Economic Research, Hitotsubashi University
 Keiichirō Kobayashi (Research Director), Visiting Professor, Faculty of Economics, Keiō University
 Shin’ichi Kitaoka (Distinguished Fellow), president, Japan International Cooperation Agency (JICA)
 Kazumasa Kusaka (Trustee), President, Japan Economic Foundation
 Reiko Kuroda (Trustee), Designated Professor, Institute of Science and Technology Research, Chubu University; Professor Emeritus, University of Tokyo
 Yōhei Sasakawa (Adviser to the President), Chairman, The Nippon Foundation
 Kimito Nakae (Auditor), President, Rokinren Bank
 Toshihiko Fukui (Nonexecutive Director), President, Canon Institute for Global Studies
 Masahito Monguchi, Adviser, Anderson Mori & Tomotsune
 Tsuneo Watanabe (Senior Fellow)
 Masahiko Aoki (Distinguished Fellow), Professor of Economics, Stanford University

References

External links 
Tokyo Foundation for Policy Research English website
Sylff Association website

Foundations based in Japan
Think tanks based in Japan
Political organizations based in Japan